Z-Type is a typing shoot'em up developed by Germany-based developer Dominic Szablewski of PhobosLab, originally developed for browser in 2011 and later released for mobile in 2016. Its gameplay is similar to Space Invaders and also Mario Teaches Typing. Players, instead of shooting, defeat enemies by typing on their keyboard. The smaller the number of errors, the higher the score.

References

See also
The Typing of the Dead

2011 video games
Mobile games
Fixed shooters
Browser games
Typing video games
Video games developed in Germany
Video games set in outer space